This article contains a list of members of the Louisville Metro Council since its creation in 2003.

External links
Louisville Metro Council
With Dan Johnson removed, Metro Council opens process to pick his replacement by Phillip M. Bailey – The Courier-Journal, November 20, 2017.

Government of Louisville, Kentucky
Louisville, Kentucky-related lists